In category theory, a branch of mathematics, a globular set is a higher-dimensional generalization of a directed graph. Precisely, it is a sequence of sets  equipped with pairs of functions  such that
 
 
(Equivalently, it is a presheaf on the category of “globes”.) The letters "s", "t" stand for "source" and "target" and one imagines  consists of directed edges at level n.

A variant of the notion was used by Grothendieck to introduce the notion of an ∞-groupoid. Extending Grothendieck's work, gave a definition of a weak ∞-category in terms of globular sets.

References

Further reading 
Dimitri Ara. On the homotopy theory of Grothendieck ∞ -groupoids. J. Pure Appl. Algebra, 217(7):1237–1278, 2013, arXiv:1206.2941 .

External links 
https://ncatlab.org/nlab/show/globular+set

Category theory